Johan Munters (born 23 August 1978) is a Swedish former ski jumper who competed from 1995 to 2001. His best individual World Cup finish was 18th in Kuopio on 24 November 2000, and 10th in a team event in Willingen on 2 February 2001.

References

External links

1978 births
Living people
Swedish people of Indonesian descent
Swedish male ski jumpers